David Sims (born October 26, 1955, in Atlanta, Georgia) is a former professional American football player who played running back for three seasons for the Seattle Seahawks. He led the National Football League in touchdowns in 1978 with 15, but suffered a career-ending injury early the next season. He played college football for Georgia Tech and was elected to the Georgia Tech Hall of Fame in 1985.

References

1955 births
Living people
Players of American football from Atlanta
American football running backs
Seattle Seahawks players
Georgia Tech Yellow Jackets football players